Walcott Bay is a bay indenting the coast of Victoria Land between Walcott Glacier and Heald Island. It was named by the British Antarctic Expedition (1910–13) in association with Walcott Glacier.

Bays of Victoria Land
Scott Coast